This is a list of cases reported in volume 135 of United States Reports, decided by the Supreme Court of the United States in 1890.

Justices of the Supreme Court at the time of volume 135 U.S. 

The Supreme Court is established by Article III, Section 1 of the Constitution of the United States, which says: "The judicial Power of the United States, shall be vested in one supreme Court . . .". The size of the Court is not specified; the Constitution leaves it to Congress to set the number of justices. Under the Judiciary Act of 1789 Congress originally fixed the number of justices at six (one chief justice and five associate justices). Since 1789 Congress has varied the size of the Court from six to seven, nine, ten, and back to nine justices (always including one chief justice).

When the cases in volume 135 U.S. were decided the Court comprised the following nine members:

Notable Case in 135 U.S.

In re Neagle
In re Neagle,  135 U.S. 1 (1890), concerned the legal immunity of  federal officers from state prosecution when acting within the scope of their federal authority. A U.S. Marshal, Neagle, was appointed by the United States Attorney General to serve as Justice Stephen J. Field's bodyguard while Field rode circuit in California. In 1889, on a train in California, a man known to have threatened Field with death due to an adverse legal decision struck Field with his fists. Knowing that the man had previously carried a knife and threatened Field with it, Neagle fatally shot the attacker, and was later arrested by a state sheriff. A federal court ordered that Neagle be released. On appeal, the U.S. Supreme Court affirmed, holding that, as the source of all Executive authority, the President could act in the absence of specific statutory authority since there were no laws that provided for protection of federal judges by the Executive branch. Constitutionally, the decision determined that the Executive branch, like Congress, exercised its own "necessary and proper" authority.

Citation style 

Under the Judiciary Act of 1789 the federal court structure at the time comprised District Courts, which had general trial jurisdiction; Circuit Courts, which had mixed trial and appellate (from the US District Courts) jurisdiction; and the United States Supreme Court, which had appellate jurisdiction over the federal District and Circuit courts—and for certain issues over state courts. The Supreme Court also had limited original jurisdiction (i.e., in which cases could be filed directly with the Supreme Court without first having been heard by a lower federal or state court). There were one or more federal District Courts and/or Circuit Courts in each state, territory, or other geographical region.

Bluebook citation style is used for case names, citations, and jurisdictions.  
 e.g.,"C.C.D.N.J." = United States Circuit Court for the District of New Jersey
 e.g.,"D. Mass." = United States District Court for the District of Massachusetts 
 "E." = Eastern; "M." = Middle; "N." = Northern; "S." = Southern; "W." = Western
 e.g.,"C.C.S.D.N.Y." = United States Circuit Court for the Southern District of New York
 e.g.,"M.D. Ala." = United States District Court for the Middle District of Alabama
 "Ct. Cl." = United States Court of Claims
 The abbreviation of a state's name alone indicates the highest appellate court in that state's judiciary at the time. 
 e.g.,"Pa." = Supreme Court of Pennsylvania
 e.g.,"Me." = Supreme Judicial Court of Maine

List of cases in volume 135 U.S.

Notes and references

External links
  Case reports in volume 135 from Library of Congress
  Case reports in volume 135 from Court Listener
  Case reports in volume 135 from the Caselaw Access Project of Harvard Law School
  Case reports in volume 135 from Google Scholar
  Case reports in volume 135 from Justia
  Case reports in volume 135 from Open Jurist
 Website of the United States Supreme Court
 United States Courts website about the Supreme Court
 National Archives, Records of the Supreme Court of the United States
 American Bar Association, How Does the Supreme Court Work?
 The Supreme Court Historical Society

1890 in United States case law